Journal of Family Issues is a peer-reviewed academic journal that publishes papers in the field of family studies. The journal's editor-in-chief is Constance L. Shehan  (University of Florida). It was established in 1980 and is currently published by SAGE Publications.

Impact 
According to the Journal Citation Reports, its 2018 impact factor is 1.607, ranking it 20 out of 46 journals in the category "Family Studies".

Abstracting and indexing 
Journal of Family Issues is abstracted and indexed in Scopus and the Social Sciences Citation Index.

References

External links 
 

SAGE Publishing academic journals
English-language journals
Family therapy journals
Sociology journals
Monthly journals
Publications established in 1980